Colm Mac Con Iomaire is an Irish composer and musician from Blackrock, County Dublin, Ireland, who plays violin and sings with The Frames.

He is the son of Liam Mac Con Iomaire, a writer, journalist and broadcaster. 

He attended school at Coláiste Eoin, an Irish Language secondary school (Meánscoil) in Co. Dublin. While there, in 1987, he was a founder member of the Irish folk group Kíla.

Mac Con Iomaire has been involved with The Frames since 1990 and his interest in the Irish Language led to The Frames's involvement in two Irish-language albums released for the Irish charity Concern during Seachtain na Gaeilge. This included an Irish-language version of the Burn the Maps track "Locusts" entitled "Lócáistí" on the SnaG 05 album in 2005 and a song called "Pian agus Ciúnas" on the 2006 album Ceol '06.

He has been a touring member of The Swell Season since 2006, and played violin on their 2008 album Strict Joy. He also played violin on David Gray's 1998 album White Ladder (on the track "Silver Lining"). Colm played violin for Damien Rice in his World renowned album "O" in 2002 and helped finish his friend the late Mic Christopher's only solo album "Skylarking" also in 2002.

Mac Con Iomaire's first solo album, The Hare's Corner (Cúinne an Ghiorria), was released in 2008. It was nominated for a 2009 Meteor Award for Best Traditional/Folk Album. His second solo album, And Now the Weather (Agus Anois an Aimsir), was released in April 2015. His third solo album, The River Holds Its Breath (Tost ar an Abhainn), was released in 2019.

He had a cameo role in the 1991 film The Commitments.

References

External links
 Official website
 
 2015 Irish Times interview
 Other Voices: Courage 2020, Colm Mac Con Iomaire live in concert

Year of birth missing (living people)
Living people
20th-century Irish people
21st-century Irish people
21st-century violinists
Dublin fiddlers
Irish fiddlers
Irish folk musicians
Irish keyboardists
Irish rock musicians
Musicians from County Dublin
People educated at Coláiste Eoin
The Frames members